King Edward Point (also known as KEP) is a permanent British Antarctic Survey research station on South Georgia island and is the capital of the British Overseas Territory of South Georgia and the South Sandwich Islands. It is situated in Cumberland East Bay on the northeastern coast of the island. The settlement is the smallest capital in the world by population. It is sometimes confusingly referred to as Grytviken, which is the site of the disused whaling station, nearby at the head of King Edward Cove.

History

The area was explored by the Swedish Antarctic Expedition of 1901–04 under Otto Nordenskiöld. It was named around 1906 after King Edward VII of the United Kingdom. Since 1909, King Edward Point has been the residence of a British Magistrate administering the island. In 1925, the government of the United Kingdom established Discovery House, a marine laboratory for Discovery Investigations.

Research station
On 1 January 1950, the station ownership was assumed by the Falkland Islands Dependencies Survey. The station was manned from 1 January 1952 to 13 November 1969. The British Antarctic Survey provided the British presence at the station until 1982.

At the beginning of the Falklands War on 3 April 1982, Argentine forces occupied South Georgia and closed the station. They were soon expelled during Operation Paraquet later the same month and British military forces retook the point. A series of civilian Marine Officers was appointed to carry out customs and fisheries duties for the South Georgia Government from 1991, and were billeted with the small garrison.

On 22 March 2001, the British Antarctic Survey reopened the station on behalf of the Government of South Georgia and the South Sandwich Islands (GSGSSI). Most of the old, dilapidated (and arguably historic) buildings were destroyed to make way for new ones, with the exception of Discovery House (1925) and the Gaol (1912).

Currently twelve BAS personnel overwinter at the station, rising to around 22 in summer. Two Government Officers plus partners are stationed on KEP, overlapping by about three months during the busy winter fishing season. Summer staff from the Museum at Grytviken are also accommodated at KEP.

The continued occupation of the station serves a political purpose as well: it helps to maintain British sovereignty against Argentina's claim for ownership of the territory.

The chief activities of the station are applied fisheries research on behalf of the Government of South Georgia and South Sandwich Islands, to assist its policies for sustainable management of the commercial fishery, and to provide logistic support for the Government Officer(s).

Climate
King Edward Point has a tundra climate (Köppen ET) with long, cold winters and short, cool summers.

See also
 List of Antarctic research stations
 List of Antarctic field camps

References

External links

King Edward Point
 British Antarctic Survey Research Station King Edward Point, South Georgia

Headlands of South Georgia
Falklands War in South Georgia
Capitals of British Overseas Territories
Research stations
Capitals in South America
South Georgia
Edward VII